An oceanic climate, also known as a marine climate, is the humid temperate climate sub-type in Köppen classification represented as Cfb, typical of west coasts in higher middle latitudes of continents, generally featuring cool summers and mild winters (for their latitude), with a relatively narrow annual temperature range and few extremes of temperature. Oceanic climates can be found in both hemispheres generally between 45 and 63 latitude, most notably in northwestern Europe, northwestern America, as well as New Zealand.

Precipitation

Locations with oceanic climates tend to feature frequent cloudy conditions with precipitation, low hanging clouds, and frequent fronts and storms. Thunderstorms are normally few, since strong daytime heating and hot and cold air masses meet infrequently in the region. In most areas with an oceanic climate, precipitation comes in the form of rain for the majority of the year. Most oceanic climate zones, or at least a part of them, however, experience at least one snowfall per year. In the poleward locations of the oceanic climate zone ("subpolar oceanic climates", described in greater detail below), snowfall is more frequent and commonplace.

Temperature

Overall temperature characteristics of the oceanic climates feature cool temperatures and infrequent extremes of temperature. Summers are warm but not hot, with the warmest month having a mean temperature below . Poleward of the latter is a subtype of it and is the subpolar oceanic climate (Köppen Cfc), with long but relatively mild (for their latitude) winters and cool and short summers (average temperatures of at least  for one to three months). Examples of this climate include parts of coastal Iceland, the coast of Norway north of Bodø, the Scottish Highlands, the mountains of Vancouver Island, and Haida Gwaii in Canada, in the Northern Hemisphere and extreme southern Chile in the Southern Hemisphere (examples include Punta Arenas), the Tasmanian Central Highlands, and parts of New Zealand.

The cause 

Oceanic climates are not necessarily found in coastal locations on the aforementioned parallels; however, in most cases oceanic climates parallel higher middle latitude oceans.  The polar jet stream, which moves in a west to east direction across the middle latitudes, advances low pressure systems, storms, and fronts. In coastal areas of the higher middle latitudes (45–60° latitude), the prevailing onshore flow creates the basic structure of most oceanic climates. Oceanic climates are a product and reflection of the cool ocean adjacent to them. In the autumn, winter, and early spring, when the polar jet stream is most active, the frequent passing of marine weather systems creates the frequent fog, cloudy skies, and light drizzle often associated with oceanic climates. In summer, high pressure often pushes the prevailing westerlies north of many oceanic climates, often creating a drier summer climate (for example in the northwest coast of North America, bathed by the Pacific Ocean).

The North Atlantic Gulf Stream, a tropical oceanic current that passes north of the Caribbean and up the East Coast of the United States to North Carolina, then heads east-northeast to the Grand Banks of Newfoundland, is thought to greatly modify the climate of northwest Europe. As a result of the North Atlantic Current, west coast areas located in high latitudes like Ireland, the UK, and Norway have much milder winters (for their latitude) than would otherwise be the case. The lowland attributes of western Europe also help drive marine air masses into continental areas, enabling cities such as Dresden, Prague, and Vienna to have maritime climates in spite of being located well inland from the ocean.

Locations

Europe

Oceanic climates in Europe occur mostly in Western Europe. It starts in northwestern Europe, from the British Isles eastward to central Europe. Most of France (away from the Mediterranean), Belgium, the Netherlands, Austria, Luxembourg, Denmark, western Germany, south coast and western areas of Norway north to Skrova Lofoten, several parts of Czech Republic, the north coast of Spain (Asturias, Basque Country, Cantabria, Galicia and north of Navarre, Aragon and Catalonia), the western Azores off the coast of Portugal, the north of Serbia and far southern portions of Sweden, also have oceanic climates.

Examples of oceanic climates are found in Glasgow, London, Bergen, Amsterdam, Dublin, Berlin, Hamburg, Vienna, Bilbao, Oviedo, Biarritz, A Coruña, Bayonne, Zürich, Copenhagen, Prague, Skagen, and Paris. With decreasing distance to the Mediterranean Sea, the oceanic climate of northwest Europe gradually changes to the subtropical dry-summer or Mediterranean climate of southern Europe. The line between Oceanic and Continental climates in Europe runs in a generally west to east direction. For example, western Germany is more impacted by milder Atlantic air masses than is eastern Germany. Thus, winters across Europe become colder to the east, and (in some locations) summers become hotter. The line between oceanic Europe and Mediterranean Europe normally runs north to south and is related to changes in precipitation patterns and differences to seasonal temperatures.

The Americas

The oceanic climate exists in an arc spreading across the northwestern coast of North America from the Alaskan panhandle to northern California, in general the coastal areas of the Pacific Northwest. It includes the western parts of Washington and Oregon, the Alaskan panhandle, western portions of British Columbia, and northwestern California.  In addition, some east coast areas such as Block Island, Cape Cod, Martha's Vineyard, and Nantucket have a similar climate.  An extensive area of oceanic climates distinguishes the coastal regions of southern Chile and extends into bordering Argentina.

All mid-latitude oceanic climates are classified as humid. However, some rainshadow climates feature thermal régimes similar to those of oceanic climates but with steppe-like (BSk) or even desert-like (BWk) scarcity of precipitation. Despite the oceanic-like thermal regimes, these areas are generally classified as steppe or desert climates. These arid versions of oceanic climates are found in eastern Washington and Oregon to the east of the Cascade Range in the United States, in the Okanagan Valley in British Columbia in Canada, Patagonia in southern Argentina, and the Atacama Desert in northern Chile.

Africa
The only noteworthy area of maritime climate at or near sea-level within Africa is in South Africa from Mossel Bay on the Western Cape coast to Plettenberg Bay (the Garden Route), with additional pockets of this climate inland of the Eastern Cape and KwaZulu-Natal coast. It is usually warm most of the year with no pronounced rainy season, but slightly more rain in autumn and spring. The Tristan da Cunha archipelago in the South Atlantic also has an oceanic climate.

Asia and Oceania

The oceanic climate is prevalent in the more southerly parts of Oceania. A mild maritime climate is in existence in New Zealand. It occurs in a few areas of Australia, namely in the southeast, although average high temperatures during summers there tend to be higher and the summers drier than is typical of oceanic climates, with summer maxima sometimes exceeding . The climate is found in Tasmania, southern half of Victoria and southeastern New South Wales (southwards from Wollongong).

The coastal part of northwestern Turkey, from northern Istanbul to around Inebolu, features this climate. Additionally parts of the northeastern coast of Honshu, such as Mutsu, Aomori in Japan, feature this climate.

Indian Ocean
Île Amsterdam and Île Saint-Paul, both part of the French Southern and Antarctic Lands, are located in the subtropics and have an oceanic climate (akin to Tristan da Cunha; see above).

Varieties

Subtropical highland variety (Cfb, Cwb, Cwc)

The subtropical highland climate, or monsoon-influenced temperate oceanic climate, is the variety of the oceanic climate that exists in elevated portions of the world that are within either the tropics or subtropics, though it is typically found in mountainous locations in some tropical countries. Despite the latitude, the higher altitudes of these regions mean that the climate tends to share characteristics with oceanic climates, though it can experience noticeably drier weather during the lower-sun "winter" season, and it usually has warmer winters than most oceanic climates.

In locations outside the tropics, other than the drying trend in the winter, subtropical highland climates tend to be essentially identical to an oceanic climate, with mild summers and noticeably cooler winters, plus, in some instances, some snowfall. In the tropics, a subtropical highland climate typically features spring-like weather year-round. Temperatures there remain relatively constant throughout the year and snowfall is seldom seen.

Areas with this climate feature monthly averages below  but above  (or  using American standards). At least one month's average temperature is below . Without their elevation, many of these regions would likely feature either tropical or humid subtropical climates.

This type of climate exists in parts of east, south and southeastern Africa, interior southern Africa and elevated portions of eastern Africa as far north as Ethiopia and of western Africa (west region of Cameroon) up to the southwestern Angola highlands also share this climate type. The exposed areas of High Atlas, some mountainous areas across southern Europe, mountainous sections of North America, including parts of the southern Appalachians, Central and parts of South America in the states of Minas Gerais, Rio Grande do Sul, Santa Catarina, Paraná, São Paulo, Rio de Janeiro and Espírito Santo in Brazil,  most of Yunnan and mountainous areas across Southeast Asia, parts of the Himalayas, parts of Sri Lanka, and parts of the Hawaiian Islands of Maui and Hawaii (island). In the Caribbean for the most part, only the peaks in the highest mountain ranges have this climate (including the Blue Mountains in Jamaica and Cerro Maravilla in Puerto Rico, with only Hispaniola having significant urban settlements under this climate zone, such as cities like Kenscoff in Haiti and Constanza in the Dominican Republic.

However due to the high altitudes at these locations, these areas feature Cwc climates. This is the cold variant of Subtropical Highland Climate. El Alto, Bolivia, is one of the few confirmed towns that features this variation of the subtropical highland climate.

Marine west coast (Cfb) 

Temperate oceanic climates, also known as "marine mild winter" climates or simply oceanic climates, are found either at middle latitudes. They are often found on or near the west coast of continents; hence another name for Cfb, "marine west coast climates". In addition to moderate temperatures year-round, one of the characteristics is the absence of a dry season. Except for western Europe, this type of climate is confined to narrow bands of territory, largely in mid or high latitudes, although it can appear in elevated areas of continental terrain in low latitudes, e.g. plateaus in the subtropics. It exists in both hemispheres between 35° and 60°: at low altitudes between Mediterranean, humid continental, and subarctic climates.

Western sea breezes ease temperatures and moderates the winter, especially if warm sea currents are present, and cause cloudy weather to predominate. Precipitation is constant, especially in colder months, when temperatures are warmer than elsewhere at comparable latitudes. This climate can occur farther inland if no mountain ranges are present or nearby.  As this climate causes sufficient moisture year-round without permitting deep snow cover, vegetation typically prospers in this climate.  Deciduous trees are predominant in this climate region. However, conifers such as spruce, pine, and cedar are also common in few areas, and fruits such as apples, pears, and grapes can often be cultivated here.

Frontal cyclones can be common in marine west coast regions, with some areas experiencing more than 150 rainy days annually, but strong storms are rare.

Cfb climates are predominant in most of Europe except the northeast, as global temperature became warmer towards late 20th and early 21st century. However, just a few decades ago, oceanic climate was only present in parts of Western Europe, including northern Spain, northwestern Portugal (mountains), Belgium, Britain, France, Ireland, and the Netherlands. They are the main climate type in New Zealand and the Australian states of Tasmania, Victoria, and southeastern New South Wales (starting from the Illawarra region). In North America, they are found mainly in Washington, Oregon, Vancouver Island, and neighbouring parts of British Columbia, as well as many coastal areas of southeast Alaska. There are pockets of Cfb in most South American countries, including many parts of southern Brazil, parts of the provinces of Chubut, Santa Cruz, and southeast Buenos Aires province in Argentina. In Western Asia, the climate can be found close to sea level on the Black Sea coast of northern Turkey and Georgia, often transitional to humid subtropical. While Cfb zones are rare in Africa, one dominates the coastline of the Eastern Cape in South Africa.

The climate subtype can also be found in Nantucket, Massachusetts (in the immediate west and northwest in transition for humid continental, the remainder of Cape Cod)

Subpolar variety (Cfc, Cwc)

Areas with subpolar oceanic climates feature an oceanic climate but are usually located closer to polar regions, with long but relatively mild winters and short, cool summers. As a result of their location, these regions tend to be on the cool end of oceanic climates, approaching to polar regions. Snowfall tends to be more common here than in other oceanic climates. Subpolar oceanic climates are less prone to temperature extremes than subarctic climates or continental climates, featuring milder winters than these climates. Subpolar oceanic climates feature only one to three months of average monthly temperatures that are at least 10 °C (50 °F). As with oceanic climates, none of its average monthly temperatures fall below -3.0 °C (26.6 °F) or 0 °C depending on the isotherm used. Typically, these areas in the warmest month experience daytime maximum temperatures below 17 °C (63 °F), while the coldest month features highs near or slightly above freezing and lows just below freezing while keeping the average warm enough.

This variant of an oceanic climate is found in parts of coastal Iceland, the Faroe Islands, parts of Scotland, northwestern coastal areas of Norway (most of Lofoten, Vesterålen, warmest part of Tromsø reaching to 71°N on some islands), uplands/highlands in western Norway, the Aleutian Islands of Alaska and northern parts of the Alaskan Panhandle, the southwest of Argentina and Chile, and a few highland areas of Tasmania, and the Australian and Southern Alps. This type of climate is even found in very remote parts of the New Guinea Highlands. The classification used for this regime is Cfc. In the most marine of those areas affected by this regime, temperatures above  are extreme weather events, even in the midst of summer. Temperatures above  have been recorded on rare occasions in some areas of this climate, and in winter temperatures down to  have seldom been recorded in some areas.

See also
 Temperate climate
 Humid temperate climate
 Subhumid temperate climate
 Mediterranean climate
 Köppen climate classification

References

External links
 University of Wisconsin–Stevens Point: Marine (Humid) West Coast Climate
 EPIC Data Collection On-line ocean observational data collection
 NOAA In-situ Ocean Data Viewer Plot and download ocean observations
 https://web.archive.org/web/20061206100140/http://www.ace.mmu.ac.uk/eae/Climate/Older/Maritime_Climate.html

Köppen climate types